The Buffalo Head Terrane (BHT) is a terrane in the western Canadian Shield in northern Alberta.

Geology
Because the BHT is covered by Phanerozoic rocks, its extent is uncertain and only known from aeromagnetic data and drill cores.  To the south it is truncated by the Snowbird Tectonic Zone; to the north it is delimited by the Great Slave Lake Shear Zone; in the east it is separated from the Rae Craton by the 1.99–1.9 Ga Taltson Magmatic Zone; and in the west it is separated from the Nova Terrane by the magmatic rock of the Ksituan High.  In its southern end the BHT is intruded by the Peace River Arch, a cratonic uplift active since the Proterozoic.

 defined the BHT as a broad, north-trending region of aeromagnetic anomalies.  Drill cores from this region returned Zircon ages 2.324–1.993 Ga with occurrences of metaplutonic rocks in the range 1.999–1.993 Ga.  From this Ross concluded that the BHT formed 2.32–2.0 Ga and was affected by a thermal-magnetic event 2.0–1.9 Ga.

The inherited age of the Proterzoic basement rocks is 2.4–2.1 Ga.  The Rae Craton is of similar age and isotopic signature which suggest it and the BHT formed a single crustal entity at 2.4 Ga.  2.34 Ga mafic to ultramafic rocks between BHT och Rae indicate separation by this time.  BHT was then subducted at its eastern and western margins, which resulted in the arc magmatism that produced the Taltson Magmatic Zone 1980-1920 Ma and the 1986-1900 Ma Ksituan High.

Kimberlite field

The Buffalo Head Hills kimberlite field is an atypical diamond deposit. The lack of indicator minerals such as harzburgitic garnet suggests a mantle composition different from those of other diamond occurrences.
26 of the 38 kimberlite pipes in the Buffalo Head Hills kimberlite field are, nevertheless, diamondiferous. Drilling restricted to upper  but the carrot-shaped kimberlite diatremes reach below the Proterzoic boundary and contain crater facies.

References

Sources

 
 
 
 
 

Volcanism of Alberta
Buffalo Head Hills kimberlite field
Terranes